KWPM (1450 AM, "1450 News Radio KWPM") is a radio station licensed to serve West Plains, Missouri.  The station was created in 1947 by Robert Neathery. KWPM signed on for the first time on July 15, 1947. KWPM is now owned by Central Ozark Radio Network, Inc. and airs a news-talk format.

KWPM's signal was repeated by KUKU (1330 kHz) in Willow Springs, Missouri until KUKU went silent in March 2013.

References

External links
KWPM official website
Ozark Radio Network

WPM
News and talk radio stations in the United States
Howell County, Missouri